Thomas Jakobsen is a mathematician, cryptographer, and computer programmer, formerly an
assistant professor at the Technical University of Denmark (DTU) and head of research and
development at IO Interactive. His notable work includes designing the physics engine and 3-D pathfinder algorithms for Hitman: Codename 47, and the cryptanalysis of a number of block ciphers.

Jakobsen earned an M.Sc. in engineering and Ph.D. in mathematics, both from DTU.

External links
 

Living people
Modern cryptographers
Danish mathematicians
Video game programmers
Danish computer scientists
Year of birth missing (living people)